My Antidote is the debut studio album by Swedish singer Johan Palm, released in May 2009. It features ten songs, including the number one hit single "Emma-Lee".

Track listing
Teenage Battlefield [03:39]
Emma-Lee [03:03]
Come On [03:57]
All The Time In The World [03:54]
Danger Danger [03:34]
Antidote [03:45]
Satellite [04:13]
You're Killing Me [03:44]
More to Her Than Meets The Eye [02:51]
Let The Dream Begin [04:18]

Contributing musicians
Johan Palm – vocals
Peter Mansson – drums, percussion, guitar, keyboard, producer
Joakim Hemming – bass

Charts

References

2009 debut albums
Johan Palm albums